Myrceugenia obtusa, also known as raran, is an evergreen tree endemic to Chile from Coquimbo to Cautin (31 to 38°S). It grows mainly in the coastal mountains on moist sites.

Description
It is an evergreen small tree or shrub that measures up to 8 m (26 ft) tall, greyish bark, newly shoots are reddish and hairy, opposite and leathery leaves with the entire margin, and elliptical to aovate shaped, acute, obtuse and roundish apex. The leaves are 1.3 cm long and 0.6-2.5 cm wide, dark green above and pale green below, glabrous or somewhat pubescent. They possess glands that look like dots.

The flowers are hermaphrodite, solitary and axillary, 4 sepals fused at the base and 4 with free petals. The stamen are very numerous: they vary 90-190 and 4–8 mm long, a style about 5–7 mm long. The fruit is a globose berry, black when mature. Within it there are 3-4 seeds about 4–5 mm long.

Cultivation and uses
It is planted as an ornamental tree in Chile. Edible fruit.

See Also
Myrcianthes coquimbensis 
Myrteola nummularia
Ugni molinae

External links

obtusa
Endemic flora of Chile
Trees of Chile
Garden plants of South America
Ornamental trees
Taxa named by Augustin Pyramus de Candolle